Gurumurti Sastri was a composer of Carnatic music who lived during the 18th century in the village of Kayatar in Tirunelveli district of Tamil Nadu.

Family 
His family name was Paidala. He learnt music from  Venkatasubbayya. He was well-versed in both Sangitha and Sahitya. He was felicitated Madras.

Gitas 
Gurumurti Sastri composed many Gitas, or short songs illustrating Janaka (means parent, also known as melakarta) and Janya ragas. He composed around 1000 gitas which earned him the name ' Veyi Gitala Gurumurti Sastri' . He was famous for his technical knowledge of the science of Ragas. His mudra (signature) was Gurumurthi.

The Gitas he composed in Sanskrit were lost to time. Here are a few that sustained the test of time.

 Neerajanayana in Dhanyasi
 Sadapathim in Mohana
 Kamsaasura in Sahana
 Rere Sri Ramachandra in Aarabhi
 Mandara Dhare in Khamboji

References

 M. V. Ramana, Pre-trinity composers of Tamil Nadu - Carnatica.net
 Carnatica.net

Carnatic composers
Telugu people